Minor Elegance is a 1990 studio album by Joe Diorio and Robben Ford. Recorded live at the Mad Hatter Studios, Los Angeles and mixed at the MGI Records Studios, Munich.

Track listing
All compositions written by Joe Diorio except "Swank Thing" by Robben Ford, "Soul Eyes" by Mal Waldron, and "So What" by Miles Davis.
 "Swank Thing" - 5:48
 "AM, PM" - 5:34
 "E-minor Ballad" - 6:36
 "Unis" - 5:14
 "Blues for all Space Cadets" - 6:36
 "Soul Eyes" - 5:00
 "So What" - 8:26

Personnel 
 Joe Diorio -	guitar
 Robben Ford -	guitar
 Gary Willis - bass
 Peter Erskine - drums
 Oliver Hahn - piano and keyboards on "Swank Thing" and "Unis".

Production
Horst Polland & Andreas Vahsen - Producer, Mix
Larry Mah  - 	Engineer
Thomas Ossig -	Cover 
FR Images - 	Photography

Jazz albums by American artists
Instrumental albums
1990 albums